The Optare MetroCity is an integral midibus manufactured by Optare since 2013. Originally aimed at the London market, the MetroCity is based on the Optare Versa which was introduced in 2009. In the UK market, longer variants of the MetroCity have replaced the Optare Tempo SR. As at August 2018, over 250 had been built.

Variants

Diesel 
The first prototype was delivered to London United. The MetroCity is available in five lengths, with the V990MC, V1010MC, V1060MC, V1080MC and V1152MC models measuring 9.9m, 10.1m, 10.6m, 10.8m and 11.52m long respectively. The shorter models were designed to replace the Optare Solo SR in London, while the longer models were to replace the Optare Versa and Optare Tempo SR in the London market. Although the Solo SR and Versa remain in production, the Tempo SR has now been entirely discontinued in the UK market with the introduction of the MetroCity due to poor sales.

MetroCity EV 
An electric version is available, named the MetroCity EV, using a 150 kW Magtec motor.

In London, four entered service with London United in July 2014 on route H98, while nine entered service with Arriva London on route 312 in September 2015. Twelve are to enter service in early 2023 with Stagecoach London on route 339.

Operators

United Kingdom

London United were the launch customer for the MetroCity, taking delivery of four examples in April 2014. These were followed in May 2014 by twelve for Quality Line, who was the largest operator of the type in London until their closure in 2021. Two MetroCity EVs were delivered to Arriva London in November 2014, followed by a further seven in August 2015.

Other large orders have been made by New Adventure Travel, who received thirty diesel MetroCities, and West Coast Motors, who purchased eleven between 2016 and 2017.

New Zealand
In September 2017, Tranzit Group ordered 114 for use in Wellington.

See also 

 List of buses

Competitors:

 Alexander Dennis Enviro200 MMC
 Wright GB Hawk/Kite
 Wright StreetLite

References

External links

Electric buses
Low-floor buses
Midibuses
MetroCity
Vehicles introduced in 2013